The Roc City Boom 
are an American soccer team based in Rochester, New York. Founded in 2019, the team play in the United Premier Soccer League (UPSL) Premier Division, a national league at the fourth tier of the American Soccer Pyramid, in the Northeast Region's Western NY Conference. The team play its home games at Eastridge High School in Rochester, New York.

About 
The Roc City Boom formed in 2019. The Boom lost only 1 game is their inaugural season, winning the Western NY Division with a 5-1-4 record. They added to their Division Title with a 4–1 win in the annual Agness Cup. They have repeated as Champions of the Western New York Conference 3 years in a row.

Stadium 
The Boom played at Rochester Community Sports Complex, formerly Marina Auto Stadium, Rochester, New York in 2020 and 2021, and moved to Eastridge High School for the 2022 season.

Year-by-year

Players

2022 Roster 

Note: Roster up-to-date .

References

External links
 

2019 establishments in New York (state)
Association football clubs established in 2019
Men's soccer clubs in New York (state)
United Premier Soccer League teams
Boom